Compsosaris flavidella is a moth in the family Gelechiidae. It was described by August Busck in 1914. It is found in Panama.

The wingspan is about 7 mm. The forewings are light ochreous, suffused on the costal and apical half with darker ochreous. On the middle of the cell is a small black dot and below it on the fold is a tuft of raised scales. At the end of the cell are two, small black dots, one above the other, below which a tuft of raised scales, narrowly edged with black. There is also an inconspicuous, outwardly oblique black streaklet on the middle of the costa and a similar, but much more pronounced black streak at the apical fourth, reaching nearly to the termen and edged posteriorly with light ochreous. Around the apical edge is a series of short black lines. The hindwings are light ochreous fuscous.

References

Gelechiinae
Moths described in 1914